Vales or Valeš is a surname. Notable people with the surname include:

Erni Vales, American graffiti artist
Jaison Vales (born 1988), Indian footballer
Jiří Valeš, Czech canoeist
José C. Vales (born 1965),  Spanish writer
Marc Vales (born 1990), Andorran footballer
Marcos Vales (born 1975), Spanish footballer
Óscar Vales (born 1974), Spanish footballer
Roman Valeš (born 1990), Czech footballer

Fictional characters
Vales family, characters in 11/11/11

See also
 Fronteira dos Vales Brazilian municipality
 Vale (surname)
 Vales Mills, Ohio place in Ohio
 Vales Point Power Station Australian Power station